Crimson Bat is the international title for the series of four jidaigeki films (three from 1969 and one from 1970) based on the character .

Character
The character of Blind Oichi is a blind swordswoman created by Teruo Tanashita in a manga published by Shukan Manga Times, in what is believed to be a response to the hugely successful Zatoichi series. The main difference, apart from being a female, was that her weakness is a stereotyped female tendency to be emotional. The character was played by Yōko Matsuyama, future wife of the original manga author Teruo Tanashita, who had starred as swordswomen in a number of popular TV series including Kotohime Shichi Henge (The Seven Faces of Princess Koto) from 1960 to 1962, Tsukihime Toge (Princess Tsuki Pass) in 1963, and Tabigarasu Kurenai Osen (Crimson Osen The Wanderer) from 1968 to 1969. The origin of the international English title "Crimson Bat" is unclear. Some have suggested that it was due to her wearing a crimson red kimono and being "blind as a bat", as the saying goes. Others have claimed the title came from a much earlier non-related film entitled  (1958) which featured Yōko Matsuyama in a supporting role. Another (perhaps more likely) reason was that Matsuyama had just finished playing a sword-wielding character named "Crimson Osen" in the aforementioned 52 episode TV series Tabigarasu Kurenai Osen. The character appeared in 4 films released by Shochiku studios, before moving on to television just as the Zatoichi series did. An official Zatoichi-based film about a blind swordswoman was released decades later entitled Ichi, which featured the title character searching for her mentor Zatoichi (seen in flashbacks).

List of films 
  (1969) (IMDB link)
  (1969) (IMDB link)
  (1969) (IMDB link)
  (1970) (IMDB link)

In 1971 Nippon TV ran a  TV series also starring Yoko Matsuyama with Hiroshi Fujioka. This series was produced by Union Motion Picture Co, Ltd. (ユニオン映画) and ran for 25 episodes from April 12, 1971, to September 27, 1971. Cult director Teruo Ishii directed episodes 1,2,12,13,14,15,24,and 25 (the series finale).

References

Footnotes

Sources

 
 Silver, Alain. The Samurai Film. Woodstock, NY: The Overlook Press, 1977.

External links
The Crimson Bat Series on Girls With Guns

1969 films
1970 films
Japanese drama films
Jidaigeki films
Films about blind people
1960s Japanese films
1970s Japanese films